Hippocamp, also designated Neptune XIV, is a small moon of Neptune discovered on 1 July 2013. It was found by astronomer Mark Showalter by analyzing archived Neptune photographs the Hubble Space Telescope captured between 2004 and 2009. The moon is so dim that it was not observed when the Voyager 2 space probe flew by Neptune and its moons in 1989. Due to its unusually close distance to Neptune's largest inner moon Proteus, it has been hypothesized that Hippocamp may have accreted from material ejected by an impact on Proteus several billion years ago. The moon was formerly known by its provisional designation S/2004 N 1 until February 2019, when it was formally named Hippocamp, after the mythological sea-horse symbolizing Poseidon in Greek mythology.

History

Discovery 
Hippocamp was discovered by a team of astronomers led by Mark Showalter of the SETI Institute on 1 July 2013. Showalter was examining archival Hubble Space Telescope images of Neptune from 2009, as part of his study on the ring arcs of Neptune. Since the inner moons and ring arcs of Neptune orbit quickly, Showalter developed and used a technique similar to panning, where multiple short-exposure images are gathered and digitally warped to compensate for orbital motion and to allow stacking of multiple images to bring out faint details. On a whim, Showalter decided to extend his analysis to regions beyond Neptune's ring system; he then found Hippocamp as a faint but unambiguous white dot.

To confirm the moon, Showalter further analyzed over 150 archival Hubble images going back to 2004. Within a week, Showalter repeatedly found Hippocamp in these images and was able to identify the moon at ten different observation times from 2004 to 2009. Showalter had also checked images from the Voyager 2 spacecraft to find any detections of Hippocamp during its 1989 Neptune flyby, but was unable to identify the moon since it was too dim to be detected by Voyager 2s cameras. Nonetheless, the number of archival Hubble images with Hippocamp was enough to determine the moon's orbit. The discovery of Hippocamp was formally announced in a notice issued by the International Astronomical Union's Central Bureau for Astronomical Telegrams, along with a press release by the Space Telescope Science Institute on 15 July 2013. Given that the relevant images examined by Showalter were available to the public, the discovery could have been made by anyone.

Naming 
The moon is named after the hippocampus, a mythological creature depicted as having the upper body of a horse with the lower body of a fish in Greek mythology. The hippocampus symbolizes the Greek sea god Poseidon as well as the Roman sea god Neptune. In Roman mythology, Neptune would often drive a sea-chariot pulled by hippocampi.

Upon the announcement of its discovery, the moon was given the provisional designation S/2004 N 1. The provisional designation indicates that it was the first Neptunian satellite identified in images dating from 2004. Follow-up Hubble observations of Hippocamp were conducted by Showalter in 2016, and the moon was later given its permanent Roman numeral designation by the Minor Planet Center after its recovery. Hippocamp was formally numbered as Neptune XIV (14) on 25 September 2018, though it remained without an official name until February 2019.

By the International Astronomical Union's (IAU's) nomenclature guidelines, name proposals for Neptune's moons must be based on a figure from Greco-Roman mythology with a relationship to Poseidon or Neptune. Showalter and his team had sought for names since the announcement of their discovery; among the names considered was Polyphemus, the gigantic one-eyed son of Poseidon and Thoosa. Showalter then settled on the name Hippocamp in acknowledgement of the seahorse genus, Hippocampus, mainly for his passion for scuba diving and the animal itself. Showalter's name proposal was approved by the IAU's naming committee on 20 February 2019, and the name was announced in a press release by the Space Telescope Science Institute.

Origin 

The mass distribution of the Neptunian moons is the most lopsided of the satellite systems of the giant planets in the Solar System. One moon, Triton, makes up nearly all of the mass of the system, with all other moons together comprising only one third of one percent. The reason for the lopsidedness of the present Neptunian system is that Triton was captured from the Kuiper belt well after the formation of Neptune's original satellite system, much of which was destroyed in the process of capture. Triton's orbit upon capture is presumed to have been highly eccentric, which would have caused chaotic perturbations in the orbits of the original inner Neptunian satellites, leading to the ejection of some moons and the collisional destruction of others. At least some of Neptune's present inner satellites are thought to have then accreted from the resulting rubble after Triton's orbit was circularized by tidal deceleration.

Among these re-accreted moons are Proteus, the largest and outermost of Neptune's present inner moons. Proteus bears a large impact crater named Pharos, which has a diameter around —more than half the diameter of Proteus itself. This unusually large size of Pharos relative to Proteus implies that the impact event that formed the crater would have nearly disrupted Proteus and ejected a significant amount of debris. The present orbit of Proteus is situated relatively close to that of Hippocamp, which orbits just  interior of Proteus. Their orbital semi-major axes differ by only ten percent, implying that both had likely originated from the same position in the past. This is further evidenced by accounting for the moons' respective outward orbital migration rates, which also suggests that Hippocamp and Proteus were much closer together in the past. Ordinarily, two adjoining objects of disparate sizes would have either resulted in the smaller object being ejected or colliding with the larger object—this does not appear to be the case for Hippocamp and Proteus.

Based on this evidence, Showalter and colleagues proposed that Hippocamp may have originated from debris ejected from Proteus by the cometary impact that formed its largest crater, Pharos. In this scenario, Hippocamp would be considered as a third-generation satellite of Neptune, originating from impacts on Neptune's reformed regular moons after the capture of Triton. The regular moons of Neptune are thought to have been disrupted by cometary impacts multiple times, with only Proteus surviving intact despite being nearly disrupted by the Pharos impact event. Some of the debris ejected by the impact settled into a stable orbit  interior to Proteus, and coalesced into Hippocamp. However, Hippocamp only accounts for two percent of the missing volume of material generated by the Pharos impact event, and the reason for the absence of the rest of the debris remains unknown.

As with the other small inner moons of Neptune, Hippocamp is thought to have been repeatedly disrupted by comet impacts after it had coalesced from debris ejected from Proteus. Based on the formation rate of large craters on Proteus, Hippocamp is estimated to have been disrupted about nine times in the past 4 billion years, re-accreting back after each disruption event. These disruption events substantially reduce the moon's orbital eccentricity and inclination, providing an explanation for Hippocamp's present circular orbit despite its proximity to Proteus. Hippocamp had also likely lost some of its mass during these disruption events, possibly accounting for some of the missing volume of material ejected from the Pharos impact event.

Physical characteristics 

It is about 1,000 times less massive and 4,000 times less voluminous than its hypothesized progenitor, Proteus. Nevertheless, it remains by a wide margin the smallest of Neptune's inner, regular, satellites.

The surface properties of Hippocamp are unknown as it was not extensively studied through different wavelengths of light, particularly in the near-infrared spectrum. Hippocamp is assumed to resemble Neptune's other inner satellites in having a dark surface. Their geometrical albedos range from 0.07 to 0.10, with the average being about 0.09. The Hubble Space Telescope's NICMOS instrument has examined Neptune's large inner moons in the near-infrared, and has found evidence that similar dark, reddish material, characteristic of small outer Solar System bodies, appears to be present on all their surfaces. The data is consistent with organic compounds containing C−H and/or C≡N bonds, but spectral resolution was inadequate to identify the molecules. Water ice, abundant in the outer Solar System, is believed to be present, but its spectral signature could not be observed (unlike the case of small Uranian moons).

Orbit 

For comparison, this distance is approximately 4.3 Neptune radii, or just over a quarter of the Earth–Moon distance. Both its inclination and eccentricity are close to zero. It orbits between Larissa and Proteus, making it the second outermost of Neptune's regular satellites. Its small size at this location runs counter to a trend among the other regular Neptunian satellites of increasing diameter with increasing distance from the primary.

Being situated at a relatively close distance to the much larger Proteus, Hippocamp is subjected to its significant gravitational influence. This can allow for an estimate of the mass of Proteus by observing its influence on Hippocamp's orbit for over a period of several decades.

Proteus and Hippocamp are nearly in a 11:13 mean-motion resonance, which may be the reason for Hippocamp's sensitivity to the mass of Proteus. Both moons are outside the Neptune-synchronous orbit (Neptune's rotational period is 0.67 days or 16.1 hours) and are thus being tidally accelerated by Neptune and are migrating outward. Compared to Hippocamp, Proteus migrates at a faster rate due to its higher mass and thus stronger tidal interaction with Neptune. Additionally, the present orbital periods of Larissa and Hippocamp are within about one percent of a 3:5 orbital resonance.

Notes

References

External links 

 Hippocamp In Depth, NASA Solar System Exploration, updated 19 December 2019
 A new moon for Neptune, Anne J. Verbiscer, Nature, 20 February 2019
 Tiny New Moon Discovered around Neptune, Miriam Kramer, Scientific American, 17 July 2013
 How to Photograph a Racehorse …and how this relates to a tiny moon of Neptune, Mark Showalter, Cosmic Diary (Mark Showalter's Blog), 15 July 2013

Moons of Neptune
20130701
Moons with a prograde orbit